Syed Qutab Ali Shah, also known as Ali Baba, is a Pakistani politician who was a Member of the Provincial Assembly of the Punjab, from January 2016 to May 2018 and from August 2018 till February 2019.

Political career

He was elected to the Provincial Assembly of the Punjab as a candidate of Pakistan Muslim League (Nawaz) (PML-N) from Constituency PP-89 (Toba Tek Singh-VI) in by polls held in January 2016.

He was re-elected to Provincial Assembly of the Punjab as a candidate of PML-N from Constituency PP-123 (Toba Tek Singh-VI) in 2018 Pakistani general election.

He was deserted on 12 February 2019 due to a recount in his constituency that resulted in him being defeated by Syeda Sonia Ali Raza, a candidate of the Pakistan Tehreek-e-Insaf.

References

Living people
Punjab MPAs 2013–2018
Pakistan Muslim League (N) MPAs (Punjab)
Punjab MPAs 2018–2023
Year of birth missing (living people)